

Herbert Wagner (19 January 1896 – 5 September 1968) was a German general during World War II. He was a recipient of the Knight's Cross of the Iron Cross.

Awards and decorations

 Knight's Cross of the Iron Cross on 23 October 1944 as Generalleutnant and commander of 132. Infanterie-Division

References

Citations

Bibliography

 

1896 births
1968 deaths
Lieutenant generals of the German Army (Wehrmacht)
German Army personnel of World War I
Recipients of the clasp to the Iron Cross, 1st class
Recipients of the Knight's Cross of the Iron Cross
German prisoners of war in World War II
Military personnel from Stuttgart
People from the Kingdom of Württemberg
German Army generals of World War II